Jaakko Tapio Tallus (born 23 February 1981 in Lieksa) is a nordic combined athlete from Finland who won gold (4 x 5 km team) and silver (15 km individual) medals at the 2002 Winter Olympics and a bronze (4 x 5 km team) medal at the 2006 Winter Olympics. He also earned three medals at the FIS Nordic World Ski Championships in the 4 x 5 km team events with one gold (2007) and two bronze (2001, 2003).

Tallus has three individual career victories, all earned in Finland in 1998. He also has three  World Cup victories in team events between 2001 and 2007.

References

  

1981 births
Finnish male Nordic combined skiers
Living people
Nordic combined skiers at the 2002 Winter Olympics
Nordic combined skiers at the 2006 Winter Olympics
Nordic combined skiers at the 2010 Winter Olympics
Olympic gold medalists for Finland
Olympic silver medalists for Finland
Olympic bronze medalists for Finland
Olympic Nordic combined skiers of Finland
People from Lieksa
Olympic medalists in Nordic combined
FIS Nordic World Ski Championships medalists in Nordic combined
Medalists at the 2006 Winter Olympics
Medalists at the 2002 Winter Olympics
Sportspeople from North Karelia
21st-century Finnish people